Taygete notospila is a moth in the family Autostichidae. It was described by Edward Meyrick in 1923. It is found in Amazonas, Brazil.

The forewings are pale whitish yellow irregularly sprinkled with dark fuscous. The markings are fuscous edged with dark fuscous sprinkles. There is a short slender oblique streak from the base of the costa and a mark at one-third, as well as an irregular blotch from the dorsum before the middle reaching more than halfway across the wing. A large spot is found on the costa at two-thirds and there is a triangular spot on the tornus opposite nearly meeting or sometimes connected with it. Two smaller triangular spots are found on the termen. The hindwings are dark grey.

References

Moths described in 1923
Taygete (moth)